Chippewa Falls Senior High School is a public high school located in Chippewa Falls, Wisconsin. To locals, the high school is referred to as "Chi-Hi". The school belongs to the Big Rivers Conference of the WIAA. The school mascot is the Cardinal.

Extracurricular activities 
CFHS has a competitive show choir, Chi-Hi Harmonics. Their marching band, known as the Marching Cardinals, is a competitive marching band.

Notable alumni 
 Edward Ackley (1906), Wisconsin State Senator from 1913 to 1916
 Chad Cascadden (1990), former National Football League linebacker for New York Jets and New England Patriots from 1995 to 1999
 Seymour Cray (1943), electrical engineer and supercomputer architect, founded Cray Research
 Nate DeLong (1944), former center for NBA's Milwaukee Hawks
 Gus Dorais (1910), head coach of NFL's Detroit Lions from 1943 to 1947
 Joe Vavra (1978), former Los Angeles Dodgers player, currently coach for Minnesota Twins

References

External links
School website

Schools in Chippewa County, Wisconsin
Public high schools in Wisconsin